Kermit Moyer (born August 3, 1943) is an American author, best known for Tumbling, his collection of short stories. The New York Times Book Review called Tumbling, "a work of ringing authenticity" and greeted him as "an impressive new voice." His second book, a novel-in-stories called The Chester Chronicles, was published in February 2010 and has been called "eloquent" and "stylish" by Publishers Weekly.

Awards and honors
2011 L.L. Winship/PEN New England Award, The Chester Chronicles

References

External links
 Official website (archived)
 The Southern Review

1943 births
Living people